Procedural modeling is an umbrella term for a number of techniques in computer graphics to create 3D models and textures from sets of rules. L-Systems, fractals, and generative modeling are procedural modeling techniques since they apply algorithms for producing scenes. The set of rules may either be embedded into the algorithm, configurable by parameters, or the set of rules is separate from the evaluation engine. The output is called procedural content, which can be used in computer games, films, be uploaded to the internet, or the user may edit the content manually. Procedural models often exhibit database amplification, meaning that large scenes can be generated from a much smaller number of rules. If the employed algorithm produces the same output every time, the output need not be stored. Often, it suffices to start the algorithm with the same random seed to achieve this.
	 
Although all modeling techniques on a computer require algorithms to manage and store data at some point, procedural modeling focuses on creating a model from a rule set, rather than editing the model via user input. Procedural modeling is often applied when it would be too cumbersome to create a 3D model using generic 3D modelers, or when more specialized tools are required. This is often the case for plants, architecture or landscapes.

Procedural modeling suites
This is a list of Wikipedia articles about specific procedural modeling software products.

See also 
 Parametric models in statistics
 Parametric design in Computer-Aided Design
 Procedural generation in video games

References

External links
 "Texturing and Modeling: A Procedural Approach", Ebert, D., Musgrave, K., Peachey, P., Perlin, K., and Worley, S
 Procedural Inc.
 CityEngine
 "Procedural Modeling of Cities", Yoav I H Parish, Pascal Müller
 "Procedural Modeling of Buildings", Pascal Müller, Peter Wonka, Simon Haegler, Andreas Ulmer and Luc Van Gool
 "King Kong – The Building of 1933 New York City", Chris White, Weta Digital.  Siggraph 2006.
 Tree Editors Compared:
List at Vterrain.org
List at TreeGenerator 
 "LAI4D Reference manual", Usage of the "program" entity type for algorithmic modelling with JavaScript

3D computer graphics
Procedural generation